Agugulu is a village on the southwest coast of Tutuila Island, American Samoa. It is located close to 'Amanave, not far from the island's western tip. It is located in Lealataua County.

Demographics

References

Villages in American Samoa